Luca Bertelli was an Italian engraver and printseller of the Renaissance. He was probably a relation of Ferrando Bertelli. Bertelli is known to have been active from around 1564 to around 1589. Some of his work displays affinities with Mannerism.

Among his prints are:

Bust of Hippolita Gonzaga.
The Israelites tormented by Serpents after Michelangelo.
The Baptism of Christ.
Christ washing his Disciples' feet.
The Flagellation.
The Crucifixion.
The Descent from the Cross;
The Four Evangelists; after Coxcyen.
The Last Judgment; after J.B. Fontana.
'A Woman and Children warming themselves by a Fire; after Titian.A portrait of Saint Thomas Aquinas'' from around 1580.

References

Italian engravers
Italian printmakers
Year of death unknown
Year of birth unknown